The All-England Eleven (AEE) was an itinerant all-professional first-class cricket team created in 1846 by Nottinghamshire cricketer William Clarke.  Widely known by its acronym AEE, it took advantage of opportunities offered by the newly developed railways to play against local teams throughout Great Britain and made its profit by receiving payments from the home clubs. In 1852, some players broke away from the AEE to form the United All-England Eleven (UEE).  Similar enterprises were launched in the following years including the United North of England Eleven (UNEE) and Edgar Willsher's United South of England Eleven (USEE) which became strongly associated with WG Grace.

Clarke, as well as being the manager, was the captain of the AEE team until his death in 1856.  He was succeeded by his Nottinghamshire colleague George Parr who agreed that the AEE and UEE should regularly play against each other, something that Clarke would not allow.  In 1859, the first England national cricket team was formed as a composite of the AEE and the UEE to tour North America.

With the rise of county cricket and the introduction of international cricket, the travelling elevens lost influence and popularity.  The AEE gradually faded from the scene and had disappeared by 1880.

History 

In the late 1840s, Nottinghamshire CCC player William Clarke recognised that a professional touring eleven could enhance the local and fragmented popularity of cricket.  In 1846, he founded what would become known as the "All-England Eleven" as an all-professional team that played a few games in the North of England against more-than-eleven local teams. He originally called his side "Eleven of England". The squad arguably comprised the best English professional players of the time, as well as two nominally "amateur" cricketers, Alfred Mynn and Nicholas Felix. The All-England Eleven was inundated with requests for fixtures  and received a payment from its opponents (who could in turn hope for a large attendance). During the following years, helped by the development of railways, the team regularly toured Great Britain, doing much to increase the popularity of the game in areas that had previously not seen high class cricket.

The players were better paid by Clarke than they were by the Marylebone Cricket Club or the counties, but Clarke, who was captain as well as manager of the team, received by far the largest part of the profit. In 1852 some of the professionals, led by John Wisden and Jemmy Dean, were dissatisfied by Clarke's ungenerous and undemocratic behaviour and sought larger wages. They broke away from the team and created the United All-England Eleven. Other similar teams appeared from the late 1850s.

George Parr led the team after Clarke's death in 1856. From 1857 the two main "All-England Elevens" regularly played against each other. In 1859, six members of each team composed the squad of the first ever overseas touring English team, which played several games in the United States and in Canada.

Notes and references

Bibliography 

 Derek Birley, A Social History of English Cricket, Aurum, 1999
 John Major, More Than A Game, HarperCollins, 2007

All-England
All-England